The Zillertal Arena is a winter sports area and the largest ski area in the Zillertal valley in Austria. It has 163 kilometres of piste and 50 lifts that can transport 76,000 people every hour. It consists of two parts: one with valley lifts from Zell, Gerlos and Königsleiten and anothern with valley lifts from Ramsau and Hainzenberg.

At the start of the 2008/2009 season a second gondola lift was installed in Zell that was extended to the top station of the old Sportbahn Karspitz for the 2010/2011 winter season.

Gallery

Literature 
 Freytag & Berndt-Verlag Wien, Wanderkarte 1:50.000, Blatt WK 151, Zillertal, Tuxer Alpen, Jenbach-Schwaz.

External links 

 Website of the Zillertal Arena ski region

Ski areas in Austria
Kitzbühel Alps
Tourist attractions in Tyrol (state)